USS LST-507 was a  built for the United States Navy during World War II. She was sunk by a German torpedo attack in April 1944 during Operation Tiger.

LST-507 was laid down on 8 September 1943 at Jeffersonville, Indiana, by the Jeffersonville Boat & Machine Co.; launched on 16 November 1943; sponsored by Mrs. Raymond C. Fuller; and commissioned on 10 January 1944.

Sinking
Operation Tiger was a pre-invasion exercise carried out off the coast of Southern England on 28 April 1944 in preparation for the upcoming Normandy Landings. 

After having taken on its complement of personnel and vehicles at Brixham, the LST joined the end of a convoy at Torquay. Just after 0200, whilst circling Lyme Bay, the convoy was attacked by a group of German E-boats. LST-507 was the first to be hit by a torpedo at 0203, and had to be abandoned by 0230. It partially floated till dawn and then the bow was sunk by fire from a British destroyer. It was the only LST (out of the three hit, of which two sank) to go up in flames. Of the 700 estimated US Army and Navy fatalities during Exercise Tiger, 202 were from the sinking of LST-507.

LST-507 was struck from the Naval Register on 09 June 1944.

Units on board
The army units were: 478th Amphibious Truck Company, 557th Quartermaster Railhead Company, 33rd Chemical Company, 440th Engineer Company, 1605th Engineer Map Depot Detachment, 175th Signal Repair Company, 3206th Quartermaster Service Company and 3891st Quartermaster Truck Company. There were two 1/4 ton trucks, one 3/4 ton truck, thirteen 2½ ton trucks, and 22 DUKWs.

Wreck
This wreck site and that of LST-531 are now classed as Protected wrecks, and so diving without a licence is no longer possible.

See also

References 

LST-491-class tank landing ships
World War II amphibious warfare vessels of the United States
Ships built in Jeffersonville, Indiana
Wreck diving sites in the United Kingdom
World War II shipwrecks in the English Channel
1943 ships
Maritime incidents in April 1944